The Wa Shan keelback (Hebius metusia) is a species of snake of the family Colubridae.

Geographic range and conservation status
The snake is found in Sichuan, which is a province in China.  It is currently endangered by the effects of tourism, and has experienced a decline in habitat quality.

References 

Hebius
Reptiles of China
Endemic fauna of Sichuan
Reptiles described in 1990
Taxa named by Robert F. Inger
Taxa named by Zhao Ermi
Taxobox binomials not recognized by IUCN 
Endangered Fauna of China